The 2002 Sta. Lucia Realtors season was the 10th season of the franchise in the Philippine Basketball Association (PBA).

Draft picks

Transactions

Occurrences
The Realtors had two of its players chosen in the Philippine national team training pool divided into two groups during the Governor's Cup, Dennis Espino for RP-Selecta Ice Cream and Marlou Aquino for RP-Hapee toothpaste.

In the Commissioner's Cup, the Realtors signed Chris Clay, a Fil-American who was with the RP training pool and formerly of Pangasinan Waves from the Metropolitan Basketball Association (MBA) to replace one of their imports, Willie Farley.

Roster

Elimination round

Games won

References

Sta. Lucia Realtors seasons
Sta. Lucia